The Movimiento Scout Católico (MSC; Catholic Scout Movement) is a Roman Catholic Scouting organization in Spain. The Movimiento Scout Católico is a federation of regional Scouting associations and member of the Federación de Escultismo en España. Its groups are generally parochially organized and managed.

Member associations 
 Scouts Católicos de Andalucía
 Asociación Interdiocesana Scouts d'Aragón - MSC
 Scouts d'Asturies - MSC
 Scouts Católicos de Canarias
 Scouts Católicos de Cantabria - MSC
 Federación de Scouts Católicos de Castilla-La Mancha
 Scouts de Castilla y León - MSC
 Euskalerriko Eskautak
 ADE Mérida-Badajoz
 Scouts de Galicia - Escutismo Católico Galego
 Federació d'Escoltisme i Guiatge de les Illes Balears - MSC
 Scouts de Madrid - MSC
 Scouts Católicos de Murcia
 Federació d'Escoltisme Valencià - MSC

Program and ideals 

The Scout Motto is "Sempre alerta" ("Always Alert").

Program sections 
Castores (Beavers)—ages 6 to 8
Lobatos (Cub Scouts)—ages 8 to 11 or 12
Scouts/Guias/Rangers (Scouts/Guides)—ages 12 or 13 to 14
Pioneros (Explorer Scouts)—ages 15 to 17
Rutas (Rover Scouts)—ages 17 to 22

Scouting and Guiding in Spain